XHORA-FM is a radio station on 99.3 FM in Orizaba, Veracruz, Mexico, known as Ori Stereo.

History
XHORA received its concession on July 7, 1993.

References

1993 establishments in Mexico
Radio stations established in 1993
Radio stations in Veracruz
Spanish-language radio stations